The Amazing Spider-Man is a short-lived American television series based on the Marvel Comics character Spider-Man. It is the first live-action television series featuring Spider-Man and was shown on CBS in the United States from September 14, 1977 to July 6, 1979. Though it was a considerable ratings success, the CBS series was cancelled after just 13 episodes, which included a pilot film airing in autumn of 1977. Despite its storylines being set in New York City (the character's hometown), the series was mostly filmed in Los Angeles.

Cast and characters

 Nicholas Hammond as Peter Parker / Spider-Man
 David White (pilot) and Robert F. Simon (from episode 2) as J. Jonah Jameson
 Chip Fields as Rita Conway
 Michael Pataki as Capt. Barbera (season 1)
 Ellen Bry as Julie Masters (season 2)
The only characters to appear regularly in both the television series and comics were Peter Parker/Spider-Man, J. Jonah Jameson, and Aunt May. Joe "Robbie" Robertson (played by Hilly Hicks) also appeared, but only in the pilot. Farley Stillwell, a scientist in the Marvel universe, makes a cameo in Wolfpack. A different actress played Aunt May in each episode in which she appeared.

In both these incarnations, J. Jonah Jameson's abrasive, flamboyant personality was toned-down, and the character was portrayed as more avuncular (though oftentimes still short-tempered).

Production
During the mid-1970s, Marvel Comics publisher and Spider-Man's co-creator Stan Lee, sold CBS the rights to produce a prime time live-action Spider-Man series, to be made by producer Daniel R. Goodman. Actor Nicholas Hammond was cast in the lead role, though all of Spider-Man's stunts were performed by the series's stunt coordinator, Fred Waugh. Lee and Goodman fiercely clashed over the direction of the series during the initial production. Lee once said in an interview for Pizzazz magazine that he felt the series was "too juvenile".

The series began as a backdoor pilot: a 90-minute movie known simply as Spider-Man which was broadcast on CBS TV network in September 1977, which was theatrically released internationally. In it, Peter Parker (as an intrepid university student) gains super powers after being bitten by a radioactive spider. He uses those powers to get a job at the Daily Bugle, and to stop a con man who is covertly using mind control for personal gain.

The pilot garnered a 17.8 rating with a 30 share - CBS' highest rating for the entire year. However, citing concern over the pilot's relatively weak ratings in the lucrative adult-demographic (ages 18–49), CBS picked up the series for only a limited, five-episode order (those 5 episodes were aired in April and May 1978, at the tail-end of the 1977–78 TV season). This run of episodes debuted very well, with the first obtaining a 22.8 rating with 16.6 million viewers, making it the best-rated program for the week on CBS, and the eighth-best-rated program for the week, overall. The series ended up being the 19th-highest-rated show of the entire season, but CBS was reluctant to commit to giving the show a regular/fixed time slot for the 1978-79 season, as the series was expensive to produce and continued to underperform with older audiences.

CBS took the more cautious approach of airing episodes on a sporadic basis, strategically placing it on the broadcast schedule to deliberately hurt the ratings of specific competing shows, at key times in the TV season (e.g. "sweeps"). Former Six Million Dollar Man producer Lionel Siegel took over production duties for season two, noticeably changing the show in an attempt to grow its adult audience. These changes included dropping the Captain Barbera character; adding the character of Julie Masters as a love interest for Peter; creating more down-to-earth plotlines; and slightly toning-down Spider-Man's superpowers, to make him more accessible to adult viewers.

The second season that consisted of seven episodes aired infrequently throughout the 1978–79 TV season. The series continued to do well in the ratings during its second season. CBS officially cancelled the series soon after the season ended. The chief reason for the cancellation was that CBS feared being perceived as merely a one-dimensional, superficial, "superhero network". It was already airing other live-action superhero series or specials at the time, including The Incredible Hulk, Wonder Woman (which they resurrected after its original network, ABC, canceled it), Captain America, Doctor Strange, and had just ended (in 1977) multi-year runs of live-action Saturday morning series for DC Comics' Captain Marvel and Isis superheroes. Another problem was that in spite of the show's popularity, its most vocal fans were also highly critical of it, due to the season two departures from more comic book-like storylines, and the lack of any recognizable "supervillains" from the Spider-Man comics.

The series yielded the first live-action depictions of Peter Parker's "spider-tracer" tracking/homing devices; they are prominently featured in several episodes throughout the series.

Directors

 Tom Blank
 Cliff Bole
 Michael Caffey
 Dennis Donnelly
 Tony Ganz
 Fernando Lamas
 Joseph Manduke
 Don McDougall
 Ron Satlof
 Larry Stewart
 E.W. Swackhamer

Episodes
For their release in VHS format, several of the series's episodes were spliced together in pairs. "Night of the Clones and Escort to Danger", "A Matter of State and Photo Finish" and "The Con Caper and The Curse of Rava" were combined and presented as a single movie-length episodes. In order to smooth the jump between the two unrelated stories in each release, the production team filmed new bridging scenes set at the Daily Bugle and inserted them between the content of the two component episodes. These scenes were never broadcast, either in the series's original run or in any reruns.

The pilot and two pairs of episodes were released as movies internationally by Columbia Pictures (following their first character film rights for future films) as Spider-Man, Spider-Man Strikes Back, and Spider-Man: The Dragon's Challenge.

Pilot movie

Season 1 (1978)

Season 2 (1978–1979)

Revival attempt
In a 2002 interview with SFX magazine, Nicholas Hammond revealed that there were plans to do an Amazing Spider-Man series reunion movie in 1984. The proposal would have had the original cast team-up with the cast of The Incredible Hulk television series (a major hit for CBS), with Hammond appearing in the black Spider-Man costume. According to Hammond, a deal was arranged to have Columbia and Universal Studios co-produce the project. Bill Bixby was going to direct the TV-movie, in addition to reprising the role of David Banner. However, Universal eventually cancelled the project. Hammond said he was told that Lou Ferrigno was unavailable to reprise his role as the Hulk, because he was in Italy filming Hercules, but in his 2003 autobiography My Incredible Life as the Hulk, Ferrigno stated that he was never contacted about the project, adding that he had recently finished filming Hercules II and that his availability was not an issue.

References

External links

The Amazing Spider-Man Facebook fan page
The Amazing Spider-Man  at Superheroes Lives
2002 Nicholas Hammond interview onSpider-Man (2002)

The Amazing Spider-Man (1977 TV and film series)
1970s American science fiction television series
1977 American television series debuts
1979 American television series endings
CBS original programming
Television shows set in New York City
Television shows based on Marvel Comics
Television series by Sony Pictures Television